El Calentito is a 2005 Spanish musical comedy film directed by Chus Gutiérrez. The cast stars Verónica Sánchez alongside Macarena Gómez, Juan Sanz, Ruth Díaz and Nuria González.

Plot 
It is set in 1981 in Spain, having the so-called "movida madrileña" as a backdrop. Sara, a virgin girl, gets drunk after being abandoned by her boyfriend Toni. She joins all-female punk act "Las Siux" (initially formed by Leo, Carmen and Chus) after being told to replace Chus, who is leaving over personal and artistic discrepancies with the rest of the band. She is set to make her debut onstage on 23 February 1981, a date otherwise marked by the Tejero's coup d'état attempt.

Cast

Production 
The screenplay was penned by Gutiérrez alongside , and tried to depict both the "movida madrileña" and the "Transition". Gutiérrez herself had been a member of a band in the 1980s, Las Xoxonees. A Telespan 2000 and Estudios Picasso production, with the participation of Canal+, the film was shot in 2004 in Madrid.

Release 
The film screened at the 8th Málaga Spanish Film Festival (FMCE) in April 2005. Distributed by Buena Vista Internacional, it was theatrically released in Spain on 24 June 2005.

Reception 
Jonathan Holland of Variety considered that "thankfully lacking the earnestness of many movies with the same theme, pic's sheer exuberance carries it through its flaws".

Reviewing for Fotogramas,  rated it with 3 out of 5 stars considering that with "without renouncing a critical and progressive vision" the film's point of view "avoids complacency like the plague", highlighting the film's self-ironic proposal and biographical honesty while citing the sometimes over-the-top caricature of the bad guys and some historical licenses as negative points.

Reviewing for El País, Casimiro Torreiro considers that Gutiérrez comes out of it well with her "self-ironic" proposal, writing that the story features "a desire to come to terms with the past, but also the will to do so with sufficient doses of irony so that there is no opportunity for nostalgia to show itself".

Accolades 

|-
| align = "center" rowspan = "2" | 2005 || rowspan = "2" | 8th Málaga Spanish Film Festival || Silver Biznaga for Best Cinematography || Kiko de la Rica ||  || rowspan = "2" | 
|-
| AISGE Award for Best New Performer || Nuria González || 
|-
| align = "center" rowspan = "2" | 2006 || 20th Goya Awards || Best Makeup and Hairstyles || Fermín Galán, Jorge Hernández ||  || 
|-
| 15th Actors and Actresses Union Awards || Best New Actress || Ruth Díaz ||  || 
|}

See also 
 List of Spanish films of 2005

References

External links 
 El calentito at ICAA's Catálogo de Cinespañol

Films set in 1981
Films set in Spain
2000s Spanish-language films
Films shot in Madrid
Spanish musical comedy films
2000s musical comedy films
Telecinco Cinema films
2000s Spanish films
Films about the Spanish Transition